Allan Geoffrey Beard CB, CBE (18 October 1919 – 5 January 2015) was a British civil servant, most well known for co-founding Motability. He was awarded the Order of the Bath in 1979 and appointed A CBE in 1994.

He died in Bath in January 2015.

References

1919 births
2015 deaths
British civil servants
Commanders of the Order of the British Empire
Companions of the Order of the Bath